Namibia competed at the 2020 Summer Paralympics in Tokyo, Japan, from 24 August to 5 September 2021.

Medalists

Athletics 

Johannes Nambala represented Namibia at the 2020 Summer Paralympics. He qualified to compete in the men's 100m T13 event after winning the bronze medal in the men's 100 metres T13 event at the 2019 World Para Athletics Championships held in Dubai, United Arab Emirates. He also qualified for the men's 400m T13 event after winning the gold medal in the men's 400 metres T13 event at the 2019 World Championships.

Ananias Shikongo also represented Namibia at the 2020 Summer Paralympics.

Men's track

See also 
 Namibia at the Paralympics
 Namibia at the 2020 Summer Olympics

References 

Nations at the 2020 Summer Paralympics
2020
2021 in Namibian sport